LGBT conservatism refers to LGBT (lesbian, gay, bisexual, and transgender) individuals with conservative political views. It is an umbrella term used for what is bifurcated into two specific sub-categories, each with its own term and meaning. The first sub-categorical term, Pre-Stonewall LGBT Conservatives, refers to LGBT individuals embracing and promoting (even in the post-Stonewall era) the ideology of a traditional and often anti-LGBT (or at least non-"LGBT-friendly") conservatism in either a general or specifically-LGBT social context or environment. The second sub-categorical term, Post-Stonewall LGBT Conservatives, refers to self-affirming LGBT persons with fiscally, culturally, and politically conservative views. These post-Stonewall conservatives' social views, though generally conservative too, at the same time reflect a self-determination-stemmed and more recent socio-historical "gay-affirmation" on issues like marriage equality for same-sex couples, gay family recognition, civic equality generally for LGBT people in society, and also a positive role for (gay-affirming) religion in LGBT life, though there is not complete unanimity of opinion among them on all issues, especially those regarding the dynamics and politics of the closet and "identity management," and various legal and political issues (e.g. adoption agency placement, rights of private businesses, certain "intra-LGBT" issues of bisexuality, transgender topics, and others.) The first term can include LGBT people who are actually opposed to same-sex marriage or other LGBTQ rights while the second term, contrastingly, usually refers to self-affirming gay people who unequivocally favor marriage as a legal institution for both hetero- and homosexuals (in countries where this is feasible) and who simultaneously prefer economic and political conservatism more generally. The number of self-affirming LGBT advocates for conservative ideas and policies became more apparent only after the advent of the modern LGBT civil rights movement in the 1970s (which encouraged affirmation of LGBT identity to achieve greater consolidation of political power) even as many gay conservatives then did remain closeted in areas where (antigay) socially conservative politicians led the most organized opposition to LGBT rights. The Realpolitik and ideology situations (and alliance/coalition possibilities) for LGBT conservatives today vary by their own self-definition, and each country's (and local area's) sociopolitical, cultural, and legal LGBT rights landscape.

History

Before the Stonewall riots

In France, in 1791, Louis Michel le Peletier de Saint-Fargeau presented a new criminal code to the national Constituent Assembly. He explained that it outlawed only "true crimes", and not "phony offenses created by superstition, feudalism, the tax system, and [royal] despotism". He did not list the crimes "created by superstition". The new penal code did not mention blasphemy, heresy, sacrilege, witchcraft, incest or homosexuality, which led to these former offences being swiftly decriminalized. In 1810, a new criminal code was issued under Napoleon. As with the Penal Code of 1791, it did not contain provisions for religious crimes, incest or homosexuality. In 1852, under the prime ministership of the Duke of Saldanha, a liberal-conservative Cartista, same-sex sexual intercourse was legalized throughout Portugal.

In 1870, the draft penal law submitted by Chancellor Otto von Bismarck to the North German Confederation retained the relevant Prussian penal provisions criminalizing male same-sex sexual intercourse, justifying this out of concern for "public opinion":
Even though one can justify the omission of these penal provisions from the standpoint of Medicine as well as on grounds taken from certain theories of criminal lawthe public's sense of justice (das Rechtsbewußtsein im Volke) views these acts not merely as vices but as crimes [...].

On May 15, 1871, under Chancellor Otto von Bismarck, Paragraph 175 was enacted throughout the German Empire.

In August 1885, under Conservative Prime Minister of the United Kingdom Robert Gascoyne-Cecil, 3rd Marquess of Salisbury, the Labouchere Amendment passed August 7, 1885 becoming Section 11 of the Criminal Law Amendment Act 1885.

In 1887, during the period known as the Conservative Republic, same-sex sexual intercourse was legalized throughout Argentina.

On February 24, 1954, British Prime Minister Winston Churchill, during a cabinet meeting, bluntly replied that the Conservative Party was not going to accept responsibility for making the law more lenient towards gay men. He suggested that an enquiry might be the way forward, proposed limiting press coverage of the convictions of homosexuals, and suggested that any man caught by police should be offered the option of medical treatment. “Otherwise, I wouldn’t touch the subject,” he said. “Let it get worse – in hope of a more united public pressure for some amendment.”

In 2007, Brian Coleman, a former openly gay Conservative member of the London Assembly and former mayor of Barnet, wrote in the New Statesman that in the mid-1950s, London police were aware that future Prime Minister Edward Heath was "cottaging" (seeking out anonymous sex partners in public lavatories) and that they warned him to stop, lest it damage his career. Coleman also claimed that gays "ran" the Conservative Party in London for many years, suggesting Heath may have been “protected”. “[Britain] had managed for decades with gay men holding a significant number of public offices”, Coleman wrote.

In 1957, after the international conference Wolfenden50, the Conservative government appointed the Committee on Homosexual Offences and Prostitution 1957 to investigate what were perceived as two increasing social problems, in the context of rising prosecutions. The committees terms of reference asked members to consider ‘the law and practice’ relating to both ‘homosexual offences and the treatment of persons convicted of such offences’ and to offences connected to ‘prostitution and solicitation for immoral purposes’. The association between homosexuality and prostitution reflected the committee's assumption that both were forms of deviance threatening the family as ‘the basic unit of society’. The committee's report in 1957 included as its first recommendation ‘That homosexual behaviour between consenting adults in private be no longer a criminal offence’; other recommendations sought the tightening of the law concerning public same-sex behaviour and street prostitution, although acts of selling sex would remain legal.

In May 1965, Arthur Gore, 8th Earl of Arran and Conservative Party Chief Whip, introduced into the House of Lords a bill decriminalizing male same-sex sexual intercourse in England and Wales. During its passage, senior peers inserted a strict privacy clause, applying a more restrictive standard of privacy than for heterosexual behavior. This specified that a ‘homosexual act’ would not be considered ‘private’ if ‘more than two persons take part or are present’, or if occurring in a public lavatory. The bill passed through the Lords in July 1965 and was brought into the House of Commons by Conservative MP Humphrey Berkeley, known to be homosexual by many in parliament. After a Labour victory in the general election in 1966, Berkeley lost his seat and was replaced as the bill's sponsor by Labour MP Leo Abse.

Prospective Conservative Prime Minister Robert Boothby (later Lord Boothby), who was homosexual, was peppered throughout parliament and the establishment, and hence their political colleagues had every interest in decriminalizing their activities. Boothby was involved in a friendship and possibly a sexual relationship with Ronnie Kray, while simultaneously the long-term lover of Lady Dorothy Macmillan, wife of Harold Macmillan, Conservative Prime Minister from 1957 to 1963.

When the Sexual Offences Act 1967 passed in 1967, only a handful of Conservatives voted for the decriminalization of male same-sex sexual intercourse, including future Prime Minister Margaret Thatcher.

On June 25, 1969, shortly before the end of the Christian Democratic Union (CDU) – Social Democratic Party of Germany (SPD) Grand Coalition headed by CDU Chancellor Kurt Georg Kiesinger, Paragraph 175 was reformed, in that only the "qualified cases" that were previously handled in §175a – sex with a man less than 21 years old, homosexual prostitution, and the exploitation of a relationship of dependency (such as employing or supervising a person in a work situation) – were retained. Paragraph 175b (concerning bestiality) also was removed.

After the Stonewall riots

Rise of LGBT conservatism
In 1975, the Conservative Group for Homosexual Equality (CGHE) was founded in the United Kingdom by Peter Walter Campbell. It was the first LGBT conservative organization ever.

In 2007, Brian Coleman, a former openly gay Conservative member of the London Assembly and former mayor of Barnet, wrote in the New Statesman that many of the gay politicians in the Conservative Party joined the party and became active during the Thatcher years. He also contended that the underlying ethos of Thatcherism might well be pro-gay and it was Margaret Thatcher's personality which attracted so many homosexual men to the party. The reason he contended that the Iron Lady drew many gay men to the Conservative Party was her pure elegance, feminine perfection, perfect dress sense, and sheer determination to change society and whilst her government might have had an anti-gay aura there was simply nothing in her personal attitude to demonstrate any prejudice, she appointed gay ministers, such as Earl of Avon (son of ex-Prime Minister Anthony Eden). On the subject of AIDS it was her government with Norman Fowler as Health Secretary which faced the issue head on and refused to take a moral tone on public information and prevention work. He finishes by stating that "There are many gay Tory men who would like to sleep with David Cameron but it is Lady Thatcher whose portrait hangs over their bed!"

During the First Thatcher ministry, Criminal Justice Act 1980 was passed in 1980, legalizing same-sex sexual intercourse in Scotland.

On May 28, 1988, during the Third Thatcher ministry, Clause 28 of the Local Government Act 1988 received a 2 to 1 majority in the House of Lords and a vote of 254 to 201 in the House of Commons.

In 1991, the CGHE reconstituted at the Conservative Party Conference and renamed the Tory Campaign for Homosexual Equality (TORCHE). The organization would remain active til 2004 when it disbanded.

On April 21, 2003, the Ba'athist regime in Iraq was deposed. The Coalition Provisional Authority, established by the George W. Bush administration, abolished the death penalty and reverted to a revised 1988 penal code, thus legalizing same-sex sexual intercourse in Iraq.

On June 24, 2004, Fine Gael proposed legalizing civil partnerships for same-sex and opposite-sex couples who choose not to marry, the first Irish political party to do so. In November 2004, in reaction to the legal challenge on tax issues Taoiseach and Fianna Fáil leader Bertie Ahern said "Couples want equality and we should try to deal with some of those issues" but added that moves to legalise gay marriage are "a long way off". During the 2004 Irish presidential election, Fianna Fáil, Fine Gael, and Progressive Democrats, produced policies or made statements in favor of varying forms of recognition for same-sex couples. During the 2007 Irish general election, the manifestos of Fianna Fáil, Fine Gael, and Progressive Democrats, supported civil unions for same-sex couples. All parties ran advertisements in Gay Community News (GNC) with commitments to same-sex couples.

In 2010, Ógra Fianna Fáil came out in favor of same-sex marriage.

In 2010, the Botswana government, under the control of the Botswana Democratic Party, passed an amendment to its Employment Act that will bring an end to dismissal based on an individual's sexual orientation or HIV status.

In July 2011, Young Fine Gael came out in favor of same-sex marriage.

On October 5, 2011, British Prime Minister David Cameron said at a Conservative Party conference that "So I don't support gay marriage despite being a Conservative. I support gay marriage because I'm a Conservative."

On March 3, 2012, Fianna Fáil came out in favour of same-sex marriage in Ireland.

On February 5, 2013, Marriage Act 2013, during its second reading, received in the House of Commons of the United Kingdom that Conservatives voted 126 for, 134 against (including 8 voted against from the Democratic Unionist Party), 5 both, and 36 did not vote. On May 21, 2013, the act, during its third reading, received in the House of Commons that Conservatives voted 117 for, 127 against (including 8 voted against from the Democratic Unionist Party), 7 both, and 51 did not vote. On June 4, 2013, the act, during its second reading, received in the House of Lords that Conservatives voted against the Dear Amendment to reject second reading, 66 voted in favour, including 2 in favour from the Democratic Unionist Party, 1 in favour from Ulster Unionist Party, and 2 in favor from UK Independence Party, and 63 did not vote. The act had its third reading on July 15, 2013, and was passed by a simple voice vote. The amended Bill returned to the House of Commons for approval of the amendments on 16 July 2013, which the House approved on the same day.

On November 5, 2013, Fine Gael came out in favour of same-sex marriage in Ireland.

On May 22, 2015, the Thirty-Fourth Amendment (Marriage Equality Act) to the Irish Constitution was passed in Ireland via national referendum. 62% of Irish voters voted in favour of same-sex marriage. Voter turnout was 61% of the national electorate. The referendum was introduced under the Fine Gael-Labour coalition government.

By country

Belgium

In Belgium, while centre-right parties like the New Flemish Alliance support LGBT rights. As of 2014 none of the major conservative party's is opposed to LGBT rights

Brazil
Before and following the Impeachment process against Dilma Rousseff, several gay conservatives have been visible. Clodovil Hernandes of the Christian Labour Party and later the Party of the Republic before his death in 2009 is considered to be the first known gay MP for the Chamber of Deputies.

On 16 January 2017, Marcelo Crivella, the mayor of Rio de Janeiro, promoted Nélio Georgini, a gay evangelical conservative, to the head of the city LGBT council.

In 2018, 30% of the Brazilian LGBT community voted for the right-wing populist Jair Bolsonaro against 57% of votes for left-wing Fernando Haddad in the presidential runoff, according to Datafolha. Following the conservative wave that contributed to the emergence of the Gays com Bolsonaro Movement (inspired by the Gays for Trump organization), the 30% of LGBT votes for Bolsonaro shocked many in the Brazilian Media, as Bolsonaro is seen as a socially conservative homophobic politician. The reasons attributed to these votes were the widespread fear of violence, economic insecurity, attachment to traditional values, discontent with the Workers' Party, as well as a perceived political manipulation of LGBT activism by the left.

Canada
LGBTory was founded in 2015 as a group for LGBT supporters of the Conservative Party of Canada and provincial conservative parties across Canada. Prior to that, small groups existed locally in some Canadian cities or as discussion forums on the Internet.

Openly gay political figures such as Scott Brison, Lorne Mayencourt and Jaime Watt are or have been associated with conservative parties at the provincial or federal levels, Keith Norton, Phil Gillies and Heward Grafftey came out as gay after their careers as politicians had ended, and Richard Hatfield was outed as gay after his death. Most such figures, however, have been Red Tories, a moderate or even progressive faction within Canadian conservatism, rather than conventionally conservative "Blue" Tories; Brison, in fact, quit the Progressive Conservative Party to join the Liberals after the PCs merged with the more right-wing Canadian Alliance to form the Conservative Party.

In 2015, a contingent of federal Conservative MPs and provincial Ontario Progressive Conservative Party MPPs participated in Toronto's annual Pride Week parade for the first time in its history. Organized by LGBTory, the marching contingent included federal MPs Kellie Leitch and Bernard Trottier, Ontario PC leader Patrick Brown and MPPs Lisa MacLeod and Jack MacLaren, alongside numerous out LGBT party activists and supporters.

In 2016, Interim Conservative leader Rona Ambrose became the first leader of the federal Conservative Party to march in the Toronto Pride Parade. She was joined by leadership contestants & MPs, Lisa Raitt, Michael Chong, Kellie Leitch, and Maxime Bernier.

In 2019, Ontario Premier Doug Ford, Deputy Premier Christine Elliott, and cabinet ministers Caroline Mulroney & Stephen Lecce all marched in the York Region Pride Parade. This was the first time a sitting conservative Ontario Premier had marched in a pride parade while in office.

Eric Duncan was elected as the first openly gay Conservative MP in 2019, and Melissa Lantsman was elected as the first openly lesbian Conservative MP in 2021.

LGBT representation in politics is promoted by ProudPolitics, a non-partisan networking and mentoring organization whose members span the political spectrum.

Chile
In 2014, the doctrinal council of the conservative National Renewal voted 72.3% to reject a proposal that would have advocated limiting marriage and adoption to heterosexual couples.

European Union
Members of the European Parliament from across the political spectrum, including left-wing, have formed the European Parliament Intergroup on LGBT Rights.

Denmark
The leader of the Conservative People's Party in Denmark, Søren Pape Poulsen, is openly gay.

France

A 2013 IFOP survey of French LGBT people found that French LGBT people have same underlying trends as the rest
of the population, namely a radicalization of positions and some disenchantment with political parties. The left wing parties of France did not capitalize on Law 2013-404 with LGBT voters, which implies that the party positions on social issues are secondary to policy choices, with LGBT people having no distinction on this point the rest of the population. Despite some French media representations, sexual orientation does not appear to determine political views. With increasing acceptance of LGBT people in France, LGBT people in France feel less inclined to mobilize behind parties with the political demands of the LGBT community.

Support for the Socialist Party (PS) from 2012 and 2013 found that 21% of bisexuals supported PS in 2012, but only 16% supported PS in 2013, while LGBT people maintained support for PS and the Europe Ecology – The Greens at 27% and 6% from 2012 to 2013. Law 2013-404 has allowed the left government to maintain its support among LGBT people overall, while in steep decline in the overall population. In 2011, 50% of LGBT people supported left wing parties, while in 2012, 44% of LGBT people supported left wing parties, and in 2013, 36% of LGBT people supported left wing parties. When counting gay voters only, 45% supported left wing parties in 2012, while 38% supported left wing parties in 2013. Among non-heterosexuals, 24% supported left wing parties in 2012, while 21% supported left wing parties in 2013. Among heterosexuals, 21% supported left wing parties in 2012, while 18% supported left wing parties in 2013. Disaffection towards the left party is a phenomenon is affecting all sexual orientation categories of the population.

In 2011, 15% of non-heterosexuals supported center-right wing parties, while in 2012, 20% of non-heterosexuals supported center-right wing parties, and in 2013, 22% of non-heterosexuals supported center-right wing parties. In 2011, 17% of bisexuals supported center-right wing parties, while in 2012, 21% of bisexuals supported center-right wing parties, and in 2013, 17% of bisexuals supported center-right wing parties. In 2011, 13% of LGBT people supported center-right wing parties, while in 2012, 20% of LGBT people supported center-right wing parties, and in 2013, 21% of LGBT people supported center-right wing parties. In 2011, 21% of heterosexuals supported center-right wing parties, while in 2012, 25% of heterosexuals supported center-right wing parties, and in 2013, 22% of heterosexuals supported center-right wing parties.

Despite their opposition to Law 2013–404, the center right parties maintains its support among the LGBT electorate, but in a more fragmented way than in the past. In 2012, 16% of LGBT people supported the Union for a Popular Movement (UPM), while in 2013, 14% of LGBT supported the UPM. In 2012, 20% of heterosexuals people supported the UPM, while in 2013, 17% of heterosexuals supported the UPM. This decline of support for UPM helped benefit of the Union of Democrats and Independents, with 6% among LGBT people in 2013, given that the positions taken by some of its leaders, such as Rama Yade and Jean-Louis Borloo, in favor of same-sex marriage it was perhaps not unrelated.

In 2012, 10% of non-heterosexuals supported the National Front, while in 2013, 16% of non-heterosexuals supported the National Front. In 2012, 9% of bisexuals supported the National Front, while in 2013, 16% of bisexuals supported the National Front. In 2012, 10% of LGBT people supported the National Front, while in 2013, 15% of LGBT supported the National Front. In 2012, 9% of heterosexuals people supported the National Front, while in 2013, 13% of heterosexuals supported the National Front.

Support for the National Front is stronger in the ranks of LGBT people than among all the French people, with 13% support for the National Front in 2013. The National Front is benefiting among LGBT voters, with a +5% increase between 2012 and 2013, than in the rest of the population, +4% of heterosexuals in the same period. The increase of the National Front among LGBT people is probably due to the composition of the electorate, with more male, urban, and younger people than the average population therefore generally more willing to vote for the National Front. In Paris, 26% of LGBT residents support the National Front, with 16% heterosexuals support National Front. The National Front's opposition to Islamism is attractive to LGBT people who perceive Islam as a threat to their lives and freedoms.

Netherlands
Much of the Dutch right wing (including figures such as Geert Wilders) has evolved to include LGBT rights platforms which do not conflict with the current status quo but also embrace an increased perturbation to supposed threats from minority religions (especially Islam) which, in their view, threaten to upend the vestiges of the liberalism and tolerance which has been associated with the Dutch social climate.

The former political party the Pim Fortuyn List supported LGBT rights, and its leader and namesake Pim Fortuyn was openly gay.

Sweden
The Open Moderates is the LGBT-organisation of the Moderate Party in Sweden. The Open Moderates is an organization for everyone that shares the values of the Moderate Party and who believe that LGBT-issues are important political issues to work with from a centre-right perspective.

The origin of the Open Moderates is the Stockholm-based club “Gay Moderates” that was formed already in the late 1970s. That club had mostly social activities and it was active upon until the mid-1990s. A new generation took over and reorganized the Gay Moderates as a new more political network to lobby the Moderate Party. In 2003 the name was changed to the current Open Moderates to signal that the organisation is open to everyone regardless of sexual orientation that want to work with LGBT political issues.

In recent years, the national conservative Sweden Democrats party has softened its stance on LGBT rights and same-sex parenting with party leader Jimmie Åkesson suggesting in 2018 that the party would rewrite its program for the first time to include LGBT related issues. One of the SD's legislators and spokesmen Bo Broman is homosexual.

The conservative Citizens' Coalition leader Ilan Sadé is openly gay.

Switzerland
In Switzerland, the centre-right party Conservative Democratic Party of Switzerland support LGBT rights, but the right-wing Swiss People's Party does not.

United Kingdom
In April 2015, PinkNews found 26% of British LGBT people supported the Conservative and Unionist Party, a 5% increase from the last election in 2010, 26% support the Labour Party, a 2% decrease from the last election in 2010, 19% support the Liberal Democrats, a 21% decrease from the last election in 2010, 20% support the Green Party of England and Wales/Scottish Green Party/Green Party in Northern Ireland, a 16% increase from the last election in 2010, and 2% supported the UK Independence Party. This is the first time in the 10 years that PinkNews has polled the LGBT community that the Conservatives have led the survey of voting intentions.

The first LGBT Conservative group was called CGHE (Conservative Group for Homosexual Equality). That group was reconstituted at the Conservative party Conference in 1991 and was renamed TORCHE (the Tory Campaign for Homosexual Equality). This group was active until 2003. Some years later LGBTory was formed. LGBTory has an active membership often organised using its Facebook groups and pages and attends vigils and LGBT Pride events across the UK including Pride London, Pride Scotia, Leeds Pride, Manchester Pride, Doncaster Pride and Brighton Pride.

LGBTory campaigned in seats throughout the campaign for the 6 May 2010 General Election. There are now at least 12 openly gay and lesbian Conservative MPs in parliament.

LGBTory, now renamed to LGBT+ Conservatives, works to promote LGBT Equality within the Conservative Party and generally across the UK, actively campaigning against the Gay Blood Ban and for marriage equality, regardless of sexuality or gender identity.

The UK Independence Party has an officially recognised LGBTQ in UKIP campaigning group which is active on the social media sites Twitter and Facebook. It has been represented at the party's annual conference. Peter Whittle of the UKIP was the only LGBT candidate in the 2016 London Assembly election and afterwards was selected as the UKIP's deputy leader.

United States

Notable LGBT conservatives

Lesbian Women 

Tammy Bruce
Mary Cheney
Melissa Lantsman
Alice Weidel
Ana Brnabić

Gay Men 

Guy Benson
Bruno Bilde
Peter Boykin
Steeve Briois
Bo Broman
David Bull
Renaud Camus
Sébastien Chenu
Iain Dale
Jack Donovan
Eric Duncan
Kenny Everett
Pim Fortuyn
Richard Grenell
Darren Grimes
José María Marco
Javier Maroto
Ken Mehlman
Deroy Murdock
Douglas Murray
Andy Ngo
Amir Ohana
Matthew Parris
Florian Philippot
Søren Pape Poulsen
Jeremy Roberts
Lee Rowley
Dave Rubin
George Santos
Dean Smith
Jens Spahn
Brandon Straka
David Starkey
Andrew Sullivan
Peter Thiel
Tomas Tobé
Leo Varadkar
Peter Whittle
Tim Wilson
Lucian Wintrich
Dan Wootton
William Wragg
J.J. McCullough

Bisexual 

Dehenna Davison
Michael Fabricant
Jeromy Farkas
Daniel Kawczynski
Sebastian Tynkkynen

Transgender 

Caitlyn Jenner
Jennifer Pritzker
Nikki Sinclaire
Blaire White
Jamie Wallis

List of organizations
Some organizations include:
 Gay Voter's League (not active since 1981) – linked to the Republican Party (United States)
 Gays for Trump – linked to the Republican Party (United States)
 GayLib – linked to the Union for a Popular Movement, Union of Democrats and Independents and Radical Movement (France)
 GOProud – linked to the Republican Party (United States)
 Liberal Pride - linked to Liberal Party of Australia (Australia)
 Likud Pride – linked to Likud (Israel)
 LGBTory – linked to the Conservative Party of Canada/Progressive Conservative Party of Ontario (Canada)
 LGBT+ Conservatives (formerly known as LGBTory) – linked to the Conservative Party (United Kingdom)
 Log Cabin Republicans – linked to the Republican Party (United States)
 Open Moderates (originally called Gay Moderates) – linked to the Moderate Party (Sweden)
 Republican Unity Coalition – linked to the Republican Party (United States)
 Tory Campaign for Homosexual Equality (originally called the Conservative Group for Homosexual Equality) – linked to the Conservative Party (United Kingdom)

See also

 LGBT movements
 Liberal homophobia
 Progressive conservatism

References

 
LGBT politics
LGBT and society